This list of Christmas carols is organized by country, language or culture of origin.  Originally, a "Christmas carol" referred to a piece of vocal music in carol form whose lyrics centre on the theme of Christmas or the Christmas season. The demarcation of what constitutes a Christmas Carol to that of Christmas Popular Song can often be blurred as they are sung by groups of people going house to house during the Christmas season, and some view Christmas carols to be only religious in nature and consider Christmas songs to be secular.

Many traditional Christmas carols focus on the Christian celebration of the birth of Jesus, while others celebrate the Twelve Days of Christmas that range from 25 December to 5 January or Christmastide which ranges from 24 December to 5 January. As a result, many Christmas Carols can be related to St Stephen's Day (26 December), St John's Day (27 December), Feast of Holy Innocents (28 December), St Sylvester's Day (31 December), and the Epiphany. Examples of this are "We Three Kings" (an Epiphany song), and "Good King Wenceslas" (a carol for St. Stephen's Day). Nonetheless, some other categories of Christmas music, both religious and secular have become associated with the Christmas season even though the lyrics may not specifically refer to Christmas – for example, "Deck the Halls" (no religious references) and "O Come, O Come, Emmanuel" (an Advent chant). Other Christmas music sung by carolers focus on more secular Christmas themes, and winter carols and novelty Christmas songs often refer to winter scenes, family gatherings, and Santa Claus ("Jingle Bells", "O Christmas Tree", "Home for the Holidays", "Jolly Old Saint Nicholas", "Frosty the Snowman", "Santa Claus Is Comin' to Town", etc.).

Afrikaans

American

Arabic

Canadian

Catalan

Chinese
The English titles are taken from the Hymns of Universal Praise and the Chinese New Hymnal.

Croatian

Czech

Danish 

The list is based primarily on carols and hymns mentioned in the Song Book for the Danish Folk High School.

Where possible, a carol title is linked to its (Danish) Wikipedia entry, where the carol can be heard. Otherwise, a carol title has been linked to its entry at the Danish Hymn Book Online.

Carolling, i.e. dancing around, is practised - probably unintentionally - in Danish Christmas tradition, when a Christmas party join hands forming a chain around the family Christmas tree and walk, dance or run around the Christmas tree depending on the Christmas carol or song sung.

Dutch

English

Estonian

Filipino

Finnish

French

Galician

German

Greek

Hungarian

Indonesian

Irish

Italian

Latin

Malaysian

Norwegian

Occitan

Polish

Portuguese

Romanian

Scottish

Spanish

Swedish

Ukrainian

See also:

Welsh

See also

 Christmas music
 Best-selling Christmas/holiday singles in the United States
 List of Christmas hit singles in the United Kingdom
 List of Filipino Christmas carols
 List of popular Christmas singles in the United States
 Published collections of Christmas carol scores

References

 
Christmas carols
Carols